Podmokly refers to the following places in the Czech Republic:

 Podmokly (Klatovy District)
 Podmokly (Rokycany District)
 Podmokly, borough of Děčín